SeaChange International is a global, public supplier of video delivery software which provides video streaming, linear TV and video advertising technology for operators, content owners and broadcasters globally.

History
SeaChange was founded in January 1993 by Bill Styslinger. In 1996, the company became listed at NASDAQ. In April 2005, SeaChange bought the international assets of Liberate Technologies. 
In September 2005, SeaChange acquired UK-based On-Demand Group (ODG).
In November 2008, SeaChange acquired Mobix Interactive, also from the UK.
In September 2009, SeaChange bought eventIS, based in the Netherlands.
In January 2010, SeaChange acquired Silicon Valley start-up VividLogic.
In June 2012, SeaChange obtained the assets of Flashlight Engineering and Consulting.
As part of a strategy to become a "pure-play software provider” SeaChange did two divestitures: In May 2012, it sold ODG to Avail-TVN and its server hardware business spun out to XOR Media that same month.   
In 2014 SeaChange acquired Timeline Labs, a start-up that makes tools for broadcasters and video service providers for audience measurement via social media. SeaChange appointed Ed Terino as their new CEO in 2016, who stepped down on the 24 of February 2019 amid a conflict with the largest shareholder. On the 27th of September 2021, Peter D. Aquino was appointed as CEO. On the 22 December 2021, Seachange announced that they plan to merge with TrillerNet

Awards
SeaChange has won awards such as three Emmy Awards in the category Technology & Engineering:
 2001: Emmy Awards for "Pioneering developments in shared video-data-storage systems technology" with the MediaCluster video server
 2003: Emmy Award for "Time-Shifted Television" software suite 
 2013: Emmy Award for the "Development and Commercialisation for Digital Infrastructure for Local Cable Ad Insertion"

References

External links
Official website

Digital television
Telecommunications companies of the United States
Companies established in 1993
Companies listed on the Nasdaq